Internet industry jargon is a unique way of speaking used by people working in the internet industry. It shows how those people talk and communicate with each other in their work setting and can vary with different language cultures in different countries. The jargon consists of familiar words found in daily life, but combined and used in the internet industry to create new concepts that describe and express specific ideas. Those jargons are intensively used in their speaking. It is often hard for people outside of this industry to understand what they are talking about although every word seems familiar.

Creation and development 
In the era of technology, the internet industry develops at a very fast pace. As the industry's dominance has expanded, so have their vocabularies. The startup ecosystem is rife with buzzwords and the language of the industry has also become trendy in the corporate world. Internet industry jargon represents the mindset of people in this industry. It was used to express more specifically and make group identification. Sometimes people in this industry use those jargons to show how professional and high-end their ideas are by using these esoteric words.

Examples and definitions 
Internet industry jargon itself carries the language habit and cultural background from which it develops. The following list covers some examples of the internet industry jargon, their definitions, and example of usages in English-speaking countries and China. This list is not exhaustive and is subject to change with the renewal of the social environment and usage.

References 

Internet culture
Language varieties and styles
Internet slang